Amanda Auchter (born 1977 Baytown, Texas) is an American writer, professor, and editor. She is an editor and author of poetry, nonfiction essays, and book reviews.

Personal life
Amanda Auchter received her Bachelor of Arts degree in Creative Writing and English (magna cum laude) from the University of Houston, where she worked as an editorial assistant at Gulf Coast: A Journal of Literature and Fine Arts and was awarded the 2005 Howard Moss Poetry Award.  She received her Masters of Fine Arts in Creative Writing and Literature from Bennington College, where she served as the editor of the Bennington Review.

She is the editor of the literary magazine, Pebble Lake Review.  She is the author of the books, "The Wishing Tomb," winner of the Perugia Press  Award, "The Glass Crib," winner of the Zone 3 Press First Book Award for Poetry, judged by Rigoberto González, and of the chapbook, "Light Under Skin" (Finishing Line Press, 2006).

Awards and honors
2012 Perugia Press Award
2011 Southern Indiana Review/Mary C. Mohr Poetry Award
2010 Zone 3 Press First Book Award for Poetry
2009 Magliocco Prize for Poetry, Bellevue Literary Review
2007 Theodore Morrison Scholarship in Poetry for the Bread Loaf Writers' Conference
2007 Finalist, Ruth Lilly Poetry Fellowship from The Poetry Foundation
2006 BOMB Magazine Poetry Prize
2005 James Wright Poetry Award from Mid-American Review
2005 Milton Kessler Memorial Poetry Award from Harpur Palate
2005 Bucknell University Younger Poets Fellowship

Books

Works
 "The Good Friday Flood, New Orleans, 1927", The Journal, 2012
 "The Sister Wakes with a Tube in Her Throat", Quarterly West, 2012
 "Holt Cemetery, New Orleans", Anti-, 2012
 "Tether", RHINO, 2010
 "The Bottom Drawer", Bellevue Literary Review, 2010
 "Nothing But the Shape", Bellevue Literary Review, 2008
 "Down in the 9", Superstition Review, 2010
 "Poem for the Adoptive Mother", Linebreak, 2008
 "6220 Camp Street", diode, 2010
 "Fall of the Medici", Perihelion
 "Water Jealousy", Diagram 4.5
 "St. Cecilia, The Incorrupt", AGNI, 2006 by Amanda Auchter
 "The Martyrdom of Saint Agatha", AGNI, October 2008 by Amanda Auchter
 "Pencil in the Obvious", Born Magazine

Anthologies
 Best New Poets 2006
 Two Weeks: A Digital Anthology of Contemporary Poetry 2011
 The Best of the Bellevue Literary Review 2008
 DIAGRAM.2 Anthology 2006

References

American women poets
1977 births
Living people
University of Houston alumni
21st-century American poets
21st-century American women writers